Perl OpenGL (POGL) is a portable, compiled wrapper library that allows OpenGL to be used in the Perl programming language.

POGL provides support for most OpenGL 2.0 extensions, abstracts operating system specific proc handlers, and supports OpenGL Utility Toolkit (GLUT), a simple cross-platform windowing interface.

POGL provides additional Perl-friendly application programming interfaces (API) for passing and returning strings and arrays.

The primary maintainer of Perl OpenGL is Chris Marshall. 
As of July 3, 2011, the Perl OpenGL Project on SourceForge.net was started and all development and module support going forward has moved there.

Platform support 

 Microsoft Windows: NT-XP-Vista-7
 OS X: version Mac OS X v10.x only
 Linux: Fedora, Debian, Ubuntu, Gentoo
 FreeBSD
 Solaris

Confirmed with:

 nVidia (Quadro-110M,6600,6800,7300,7800,7950,8800)
 ATI (Radeon 9000/9200, FireGL)
 Cygwin/X Window System (Mesa)

Interoperability

Perl Data Language 

POGL is used as the OpenGL binding for the 3D graphics in the Perl Data Language (PDL).

ImageMagick: image loading, modifying, saving 

The POGL team has collaborated with the ImageMagick team to add PerlMagick APIs that allow GPUs and ImageMagick to share cache buffers via C pointers - optimizing performance for FBOs and VBOs - for use with loading and saving textures and GPGPU data transfer.

These APIs have been added to ImageMagick 6.3.5:

 Get('Scene') - returns the number of scenes in an IM image.
 Get('Quantum') - returns IM's cache depth.
 GetImagePixels() - returns a C pointer to IM's image cache.
 SyncImagePixels() - sync's IM's image cache after a write (for large/paged images).

FFmpeg: video frame textures 

CPAN's FFmpeg module may be used with POGL and the above File::Magick APIs to map video to OpenGL textures.

Performance

Perl vs C 
General Purpose graphics processing unit (GPU, GPGPU) processing is one area in which Perl can be compared with compiled languages in performance.

Based on their own benchmarks, Perl OpenGL developers claim that there are no significant performance differences between C and Perl (via POGL), when rendering a realtime 3D animated object with dynamically generated texturemaps.

They analyze their results by remarking that GPGPU vertex shaders can execute complex C-like code on large arrays of data, rarely touching the CPU.

Perl vs Python 

Perl OpenGL developers claim that POGL performs over 20% faster than Python.

OpenGL objects 

POGL provides specialized objects that enhance Perl performance.
POGL objects store data as typed C arrays, and pass data between APIs using C pointers - eliminating the need to copy/convert/cast when passing data between interfaces.

OpenGL::Array (OGA) 

OGAs store OpenGL data as typed C arrays.  OGAs may be populated by C pointer, Perl packed arrays (strings) or Perl arrays. OGAs may be bound/mapped to VBOs to share data between the GPU and Perl. Accessor methods provide a means to get/set array elements by C pointer, packed arrays or Perl arrays.

OpenGL::Image (OGI) 

POGL is a compiled module, and may be used in conjunction with compiled imaging modules (such as ImageMagick) for loading/saving data arrays (textures).

OGIs use OGAs to wrap image buffers from various imaging libraries.  OGI simplifies loading/modifying/saving OpenGL textures, FBOs and VBOs.

OGI provides an extensible plug-in architecture to support new imaging libraries: OGI supports ImageMagick (v6.3.5 or newer), and by default Targa (uncompressed RGBA files).

OGI provides direct C pointer access to ImageMagick's image cache, resulting in performance improvement in transferring images/data between the GPU and IM.

OpenGL::Shader (OGS) 

The OSG module abstracts OpenGL APIs for ARB (assembly), Cg and GLSL shading languages.

$shdr = new OpenGL::Shader();
my $ext = lc($shdr->GetType());
my $stat = $shdr->LoadFiles("fragment.$ext","vertex.$ext");

$shdr->Enable();
$Shader->SetVector('surfacecolor',1.0,0.5,0.0,1.0);
$Shader->SetMatrix('xform',$xform);

# Draw here

$shdr->Disable();

Sample renderings

Status 
The latest CPAN release of the following POGL modules are
 OpenGL v0.66
 OpenGL-Image v1.03
 OpenGL-Shader v1.01

POGL provides access to most of the OpenGL APIs up to 1.2, and OpenGL extensions, such as Framebuffer Objects (FBO) and Vertex Buffer Objects (VBO).

References

External links 
 CPAN OpenGL (POGL)
 CPAN OpenGL-Image
 CPAN OpenGL-Shader
 The Official POGL Website - documentation, examples, benchmarks, latest updates
 POGL Video Gallery 
 POGL Sample Test App 
 OpenGL::Array (OGA) Documentation
 OpenGL::Image (OGI) Documentation
 OpenGL::Shader (OGS) Documentation
 POGL Currents: POGL Developer's Blog
 SIGGRAPH 2007: POGL live reporting from San Diego

Perl
3D graphics software